Roy Roberts (born Roy Barnes Jones, March 19, 1906 – May 28, 1975) was an American character actor. Over his more than 40-year career, he appeared in more than nine hundred productions on stage and screen.

Life and career
Born in Tampa, Florida, Roberts began his acting career on stage with a stock company there. He left the Tampa company after a year to perform in touring stock theater for five years.

He first appeared on Broadway in May 1931 before making his motion picture debut in Gold Bricks, a 1936 two-reel comedy short released by 20th Century-Fox. He appeared in numerous films in secondary parts and returned to perform on Broadway in such productions as Twentieth Century, My Sister Eileen, and Carnival in Flanders until he began making guest appearances on television series. After appearing on Gale Storm's My Little Margie in 1956, he became part of several television series. In a show that was the precursor to The Love Boat, Roberts played the ship's captain for four years in Storm's next hit, Oh! Susanna, which aired on CBS and ABC from 1956 to 1960. He guest-starred in scores of series, including the western-themed crime drama, Sheriff of Cochise, the western series, My Friend Flicka, The Life and Legend of Wyatt Earp (as Texas cattle baron Shanghai Pierce, and The Travels of Jaimie McPheeters, and Brian Keith's Cold War drama, Crusader. Roberts appeared on four episodes of the CBS legal drama, Perry Mason, including the role of murderer Arthur Janeel in the 1961 episode, "The Case of the Malicious Mariner." 

During the middle 1960s, Roberts was one of the most recognizable faces on television, and had recurring roles concurrently on a number of popular programs, including:

Bank president Mr. Cheever on CBS's The Lucy Show
John Cushing, president of the rival Merchants Bank on CBS's The Beverly Hillbillies
Railroad president Norman Curtis on CBS's Petticoat Junction
Darrin's father Frank Stephens on ABC's Bewitched, alternating with actor Robert F. Simon depending upon availability.
Banker Harry Bodkin on CBS's Gunsmoke
Neighbor Bruce MacDermott on ABC's Our Man Higgins
Preston "Press" Wasco and Kelly on the NBC western, Laredo
"Doc" on John Payne's The Restless Gun in the 1957 episode "Trail to Sunset"
Banker George Bristol on NBC's Bonanza
Admiral Rogers on McHale's Navy (in some episodes, his first name is given as "John" and in others his name is given as "Bruce").
Capt. Walter A. Bascom in three episodes of the religion anthology series, Crossroads
The Governor in a season two episode of Green Acres, "One of Our Assemblymen is Missing".

In the 1940s and 1950s, Roberts was a regular in many films noir, including Force of Evil (1948), He Walked by Night (1948), Nightmare Alley (1947), The Brasher Doubloon (1947), Borderline (1950) and The Enforcer (1951). In 1953, he appeared as Vincent Price's character's crooked business partner (and first victim) in House of Wax.  In 1956 he was Colonel Sam Sherman in The First Texan. In 1962 Roberts appeared as John Kemper on the TV western Lawman in the episode titled "Heritage of Hate." 

He also appeared in the neo-noirs The Outfit (1973) and Chinatown (1974). He also had a small role in the hit 1963 Stanley Kramer comedy, It's a Mad, Mad, Mad, Mad World as a police officer. Unfortunately, his role was cut from later television and movie versions to reduce running time. However, Roberts' brief role is included in versions on laserdisc and extended-length DVDs.

Roberts appeared in an episode of the situation comedy A Touch of Grace in 1973. His last television appearance was on the January 21, 1974, CBS broadcast of Here's Lucy.  In that installment, "Lucy Is N.G. As An R.N.", Roberts played a veterinarian.

Death
Roberts died in St. Vincent's Hospital in Los Angeles, California, of a heart attack on May 28, 1975, and was interred at Greenwood Memorial Park in Fort Worth, Texas.

Selected filmography

 Guadalcanal Diary (1943) - Capt. James Cross
 The Fighting Sullivans (1944) - Father Francis
 Tampico (1944) - Crawford (uncredited)
 Roger Touhy, Gangster (1944) - Frank Williams - FBI Chief (uncredited)
 Wilson (1944) - Ike Hoover - Chief White House Butler (uncredited)
 Circumstantial Evidence (1945) - Marty Hannon
 The Caribbean Mystery (1945) - Capt. Van den Bark
 A Bell for Adano (1945) - Col. W.W. Middleton - Provost Marshal
 Within These Walls (1945) - Martin 'Marty' Deutsch
 Colonel Effingham's Raid (1946) - Army Capt. Rampey
 Behind Green Lights (1946) - Max Calvert
 Johnny Comes Flying Home (1946) - J.P. Hartley
 Strange Triangle (1946) - Harry Matthews
 Smoky (1946) - Jeff Nix
 It Shouldn't Happen to a Dog (1946) - 'Mitch' Mitchell
 My Darling Clementine (1946) - Mayor
 The Shocking Miss Pilgrim (1947) - Mr. Foster
 The Brasher Doubloon (1947) - Police Lt. Breeze
 The Foxes of Harrow (1947) - Tom Warren
 Nightmare Alley (1947) - McGraw - Final Carnival Owner (uncredited)
 Gentleman's Agreement (1947) - Mr. Calkins (uncredited)
 Daisy Kenyon (1947) - Quint - Dan's Attorney (uncredited)
 Captain from Castile (1947) - Capt. Alvarado
 Fury at Furnace Creek (1948) - Al Shanks
 The Gay Intruders (1948) - Charles McNulty
 Joan of Arc (1948) - Wandamme (Burgundian captain)
 No Minor Vices (1948) - Mr. Felton (uncredited)
 He Walked by Night (1948) - Police Capt. Breen
 Force of Evil (1948) - Ben Tucker
 Chicken Every Sunday (1949) - Harry Bowers
 Calamity Jane and Sam Bass (1949) - Marshal Peak
 Flaming Fury (1949) - Capt. S. Taplinger
 Miss Grant Takes Richmond (1949) - Construction Foreman Roberts (uncredited)
 The Reckless Moment (1949) - Nagel
 Chicago Deadline (1949) - Jerry Cavanaugh
 A Kiss for Corliss (1949) - Uncle George
 Bodyhold (1949) - Charlie Webster
 Chain Lightning (1950) - Maj. Gen. Hewitt
 Borderline (1950) - Harvey Gumbin
 The Palomino (1950) - Ben Lane
 Sierra (1950) - Sheriff Knudsen
 The Killer That Stalked New York (1950) - Mayor of New York
 Wyoming Mail (1950) - Charles De Haven
 The Second Face (1950) - Allan Wesson
 Stage to Tucson (1950) - Jim Maroon
 The Enforcer (1951) - Capt. Frank Nelson
 Santa Fe (1951) - Cole Sanders
 Fighting Coast Guard (1951) - Captain Gibbs
 I Was a Communist for the FBI (1951) - Father Novac 
 The Tanks Are Coming (1951) - Major General (uncredited)
 The Man with a Cloak (1951) - Policeman
 My Favorite Spy (1951) - Johnson - FBI Man (uncredited)
 The Cimarron Kid (1952) - Pat Roberts
 The Big Trees (1952) - Judge Crenshaw
 Hoodlum Empire (1952) - Police Chief Thales
 Skirts Ahoy! (1952) - Capt. Graymont
 Cripple Creek (1952) - Marshal John Tetheroe
 One Minute to Zero (1952) - Lt. Gen. George Thomas (uncredited)
 Battles of Chief Pontiac (1952) - Maj. Gladwin
 Stars and Stripes Forever (1952) - Maj. George Porter Houston
 The Man Behind the Gun (1953) - Sen. Mark Sheldon
 San Antone (1953) - John Chisum
 The Lone Hand (1953) - Mr. Skaggs
 House of Wax (1953) - Matthew Burke
 The Glory Brigade (1953) - Sgt. Chuck Anderson
 Second Chance (1953) - Charley Malloy
 Sea of Lost Ships (1953) - Captain of the 'Eagle'
 Tumbleweed (1953) - Nick Buckley
 The Outlaw Stallion (1954) - Hagen
 Dawn at Socorro (1954) - Doc Jameson
 They Rode West (1954) - Sgt. Creever
 Big House, U.S.A. (1955) - Chief Ranger Will Erickson
 Stranger on Horseback (1955) - Sam Kettering
 Wyoming Renegades (1955) - Sheriff McVey
 The Eternal Sea (1955) - Review Board captain (uncredited)
 I Cover the Underworld (1955) - District Attorney
 The Last Command (1955) - Dr. Summerfield
 Backlash (1956) - Maj. Carson
 The First Texan (1956) - Col. Sam Sherman
 The Boss (1956) - Tim Brady
 Yaqui Drums (1956) - Matt Quigg
 The White Squaw (1956) - Edward Purvis
 The King and Four Queens (1956) - Sheriff Tom Larrabee
 The Restless Gun (1957) as Kitt Springer in Episode "The Gold Buckle"
 The Underwater City (1962) - Tim Graham
 Kid Galahad (1962) - Jerry Bathgate
 Lawman (1962 episode titled "Heritage of Hate") - John Kemper
 The Chapman Report (1962) - Alan Roby
 It's a Mad, Mad, Mad, Mad World (1963) - Policeman Outside Irwin & Ray's Garage
 Those Calloways (1965) - E.J. Fletcher
 I'll Take Sweden (1965) - Ship's Captain
 Hotel (1967) - Bailey
 Tammy and the Millionaire (1967) - Gov. Alden
 Cry for Poor Wally (1969) - Doctor
 Some Kind of a Nut (1969) - Mr. Burlingame
 The Million Dollar Duck (1971) - The Judge (uncredited)
 The Outfit (1973) - Sheriff Bob Caswell
 Chinatown (1974) - Mayor Bagby
 The Strongest Man in the World (1975) - Mr. Roberts (final film role)

References

External links

 
 
 

1906 births
1975 deaths
American male film actors
American male stage actors
American male television actors
People from Dade City, Florida
Male actors from Tampa, Florida
People from Greater Los Angeles
Burials in Texas
20th-century American male actors